Over My Dead Body is a Canadian documentary film, directed by Brigitte Poupart and released in 2012. The film is a portrait of Dave St-Pierre, a dancer and choreographer from Montreal who is urgently awaiting a lung transplant due to his lifelong battle with cystic fibrosis.

The film premiered in February 2012 at the Rendez-vous Québec Cinéma.

The film was a Canadian Screen Award nominee for Best Feature Length Documentary at the 1st Canadian Screen Awards, and won the Prix Jutra for Best Documentary Film at the 15th Jutra Awards. It was a nominee for the Prix collégial du cinéma québécois in 2013.

References

External links
 

2012 films
2012 documentary films
Canadian documentary films
Quebec films
French-language Canadian films
2010s Canadian films
Best Documentary Film Jutra and Iris Award winners